is a Japanese slice of life anime series created by Akira Okeya (writer of Mobile Suit Gundam: The 08th MS Team and Transformers: Armada), Iku, Takeshi Anzai and Tetsuro Amino (director of Blue Comet SPT Layzner). Dubbed by Glemar F. Produced by Daume and Japan Digital Entertainment, the series was directed and written by Akira Okeya and produced by Katsuhiko Nozawa, the animation producer of Please Twins!. Character designs were done by Shinji Ochi, who did the character designs later on in Ichigeki Sacchu!! HoiHoi-san. The series first premiered on NHK from April 8, 1999, to November 25, 1999, with a total of 26 episodes.

A second season titled  premiered two years later on NHK from April 3, 2001, to November 29, 2001, with a total run of 25 episodes. The first and/or the second season was also broadcast internationally on Disney Channel Asia (Asia Pacific), GMTV2 (United Kingdom), Raidue (Italy), TRT (Turkey), ABS-CBN (Philippines), Trans TV and Spacetoon (Indonesia), TVOKids (Canada) and Hero TV (Philippines). The animation studio itself later worked with Takeshi Anzai to produce the anime adaptation of Strawberry Marshmallow.

Plot
Randy Rand is a curious 3-year-old boy who loves his pet dog named Chacha. One day, Randy is about to get hit by a car, when Chacha protects him and ends up dying. In a strange miracle the night after the accident, Chacha's spirit is reincarnated into a living yellow toy car so he can be with him all the time. The two became inseparable afterwards and have many adventures in which they learn valuable things in life. The story is set in Greenhill Town, which is loosely based on Los Angeles, California.

Characters

Voiced by: Yuko Sasamoto
Randy is a highly curious 3-year-old boy who matures through his experiences and friendship with Chacha. Everything he sees interests him and learning about anything excites him. Though he never calls himself by his name, his parents sometimes call him by his real name.

Voiced by: Chō
Chacha is once Randy's pet dog and best friend, guardian and teacher, who reincarnates as a yellow toy car. He is very supportive and also looks after Randy's safety. Chacha and Randy love each other and like to go out.

Voiced by: Atsuko Tanaka
Connie Rand is Randy's mother and Forest's wife, a loving and understanding mother who notices Randy maturing. Gardening is her hobby.

Voiced by: Takuma Suzuki
Forest Rand is Randy's father and also Connie's husband. Being a journalist, Forest has a lot of information that gets Randy all excited. Forest loves toys and is very imaginative.

Voiced by: Taeko Kawata
Mary is Randy's neighbor. 4-year-old.She always behaves like a mature individual and thinks Randy is a little kid. She tries to teach him to grow up with much avail.

Voiced by: Yumi Takada
Catherine is Randy's 14-year-old cousin who is occasionally asked to baby-sit Randy. She is part of a running gag in the series where she accidentally hits a post with her bike.

 and 
Voiced by: Tomohiro Nishimura (Nick), Kōichi Sakaguchi (Terry)
Also known as the Rap Brothers, Nick and Terry are 5 and 3 years old. They both bully Randy and Chacha and always speak in Rap.

Voiced by: Kinryū Arimoto
Uncle Daa is a man who works for the pest control. He appears in every episode and shouts "daaaaaaaa!!" at kids. The children think he simply loves to scare them off, but he actually shouts at them when he feels they are in danger.

Voiced by: Omi Minami
Tau Dinton is an intelligent 5-year-old loner, who loves to read books. He moves to Greenhill Town, right across Buddy's house, and gradually opens up to Buddy and his friends.

Chip
Voiced by: Kôichi Sakaguchi
Chip is Tau's pet dog who just likes to run around wildly and bark. At first, Tau is not so fond of him, but as Chip improves his behavior, they get closer. Chip loves ChaCha and Buddy as well.

Voiced by: Yū Hayami
Sarah is a 12-year-old ghost living in the Ghost-apartment, who stands as sister-like figure for Randy. She is the same age as Catherine and is one of the two people who knows Chacha is a dog.

Voiced by: Sayuri Sadaoka
Forest's mother who lives in Cleverland. She is very close to Randy, close enough to almost understand that Chacha is a dog. She looks at nature as one of mankind's best friend, just like Randy.

Voiced by: Asa Shirakura
Kana is a female cocker spaniel and Chacha's crush. She does not notice that Chacha is a dog at first.

Voiced by: Hisao Egawa
Hippo Truck is one of Chacha's friends. He is a hippopotamus, who dies and reincarnates into a giant truck. He is jealous of Chacha regarding Randy.

Voiced by: Mika Kanai
Bubu Pyoko is another of Chacha's friends. He is a frog who met Randy's grandmother. His spirit has been reincarnated into Forest's old toy car that he played with when he was a child.

Voiced by: Hidenari Ugaki
Bull Robo is a bulldog and one of Chacha's friends. He has been Chacha's friend since before Randy was born. He first appears as a ghost, then reincarnates inside a toy robot.

Voiced by: Mako Hyōdō
Appearing in the second season, Cindy is a circus elephant, whose spirit has been reincarnated into a Shovel Car. She is physically strong, yet a little shy but ready to help people build anything.

Voiced by: Junko Noda
Appearing in the second season, Baby Leopard is a baby leopard, whose spirit has been reincarnated into a sports car. He likes to race around town.

Eyebrow Alien
Voiced by: Keiichi Sonobe
The leader of the Eyebrow Aliens, who came to earth from the Eyebrow Planet.

Papa Rat
Voiced by: Kouki Miyata
Papa Rat is the father of a family of rats, who reincarnated into Tau's toy car. Papa Rat and his family lives in Tau's former house in Greenhill Town.

Music
The series's music in both seasons was composed by Gori Tsuno, who did the soundtrack for Bakusō Kyōdai Let's & Go!!. Sound production of the anime was handled by Half HP Studio.

Theme Songs
Bubu Chacha
Opening theme: 
Lyrics: Tetsurō Amino
Composition and arrangement: Tsuno Tsuyoshi
Artist: Makorin & Pythagoras
Ending theme: 
Lyrics: Tetsurō Amino
Composition and arrangement: Tsuno Tsuyoshi
Artist: Makorin & Pythagoras

I Love Bubu Chacha
Opening theme: 
Artist: Minako Kaneko
Ending theme: 
Artist: Minako Kaneko

References

External links
  
 

1999 anime television series debuts
2001 anime television series debuts
NHK original programming
Comedy anime and manga
Fictional cars